The women's 100 metres hurdles event at the 2006 Commonwealth Games was held on March 23–24.

Medalists

Results

Heats
Qualification: First 3 of each heat (Q) and the next 2 fastest (q) qualified for the final.

Wind:Heat 1: +1.0 m/s, Heat 2: +0.9 m/s

Final
Wind: –0.3 m/s

References
Results

100
2006
2006 in women's athletics